Madame Figaro is a French magazine supplement to the Saturday edition of the daily newspaper Le Figaro, focusing on and catering to women.

History and profile
The first edition was published in 1980. Madame Figaro was spearheaded by Robert Hersant, who succeeded Jean Prouvost (creator of the French women's fashion magazine Marie Claire). The magazine experienced immediate success, owing to its diverse contents, and the quality of the writing, targeting affluent readers. The first female Editor-in-Chief of the magazine was Marie-Claire Pauwels, daughter of Louis Pauwels.  The launch of Madame Figaro in 1980 marked a distinct distancing from the feminist movement of the preceding decade (notably from the movement to "liberate pornography" that had a goal of seizing power from the dominant moral and religious institutions). Madame Figaro had its origins as a single page feature appearing in Figaro Magazine, because that magazine's majority of readers were female, drawn to its orientation towards topics on culture and the art of living (l’art de vivre). Le Figaro publishes a number of other supplements, each on a particular day of the week, for example, an economic news supplement, a supplement for its Paris-region readers, and so on.

Madame Figaro is devoted solely to topics interesting to female readers. This has included such highly debated topics of the 1980s as: sexual relationships between men and women; aspirations towards equality between the sexes and to further women's emancipation; how to make families succeed during marriage; children and strong families.

Madame Figaro is a mainstream women's magazine, feminine and a vehicle for ideas that are both liberal and conservative, since the beginning of the 1980s. A vital part of "Madame Figaro's" content is its focus on enhancing women's careers, and challenging conventional views of women's roles in society. Madame Figaro was among the first news publications in France to publish feature-length articles on the condition of women in foreign countries, using its own journalists.

The worlds of fashion, beauty and interior design are the fundamental content of the magazine. Articles discussing elegance and distinction, all while taking a critical view of fashion's social conformity, have been hallmarks of the presentation of fashion in Madame Figaro.

Culture in its broad sense occupies a place of importance in Madame Figaro, from literature, to history, as well as music. The magazine has had many articles on French celebrities such as Jean Giono, Jean Anouilh, as well as the Rolling Stones, and Bob Dylan.

The magazine had been published by Hachette Filipacchi until 2001 when it began to be published Quebecor World Inc.

The first international edition was published in Portugal under the name Máxima. During the 1980s, Madame Figaro expanded into several countries, such as Japan and Turkey, following the trend of globalization in women's magazines. In the 1990s, the Chinese version began to be published. In 2019, Madame Figaro further developed to a total of ten editions, latest of which started in Hong Kong in fall 2019.

Madame Figaro appears with the Saturday edition of Le Figaro.

Madame Figaro today
The magazine published an online edition in addition to its paper edition. A part of the content of Madame Figaro is accessible free of charge online. The online edition also has several blogs dedicated to fashion and beauty topics, such as Fashion, etc… by Claudine Hesse.

During the last half of 2007, the circulation of Madame Figaro was 455,802 copies. In 2011, the magazine had a circulation of 449,800 copies.

The director of publishing in 2012 is Anne-Florence Schmitt. The magazine has two editors-in-chief, Nicole Picart (Fashion) and Blanche Rival (magazine).

Editorial direction
The publication is dedicated to trends in beauty and fashion. The editorial approach and the design target readers with high incomes, with luxury good advertising, and publishing articles for readers with a familiarity with current affairs.

Among its regular features are : Culture Madame, Rendez-vous Madame (public events and places), mode / accessoires et beauté (fashion, accessories, and beauty), le Carnet de Stéphane Bern (Stéphane Bern's journal), and the pages Conversation, Week-end, and others.

Notable former contributors 
 Princess Grace of Monaco
 Geneviève Gennart
 Élisabeth Gassier
 Marie-Dominique Sassin
 Constance Poniatowski
 Christine Clerc
 Philippe Nassif

Grand Prix Littéraire (great literary prize)
The Grand Prix Littéraire de l'Héroïne Madame Figaro is a prize awarded every year since 2006 by the magazine. It is awarded to a writer, who by her writing, has made a contribution to the biography genre.

 2010: Violaine Binet, Diane Arbus (Grasset)
 2009: Jacqueline Mesnil-Amar, Ceux qui ne dormaient pas (Stock)
 2008: Marie-Dominique Lelièvre, Sagan à toute allure (Denoël)
 2007: Dominique Bona, Camille et Paul: La passion claudel (Grasset)
 2006: Angie David, Dominique Aury (Léo Scheer)

References

External links

Official website
Madame Figaro Japan
Madame Figaro Hong Kong
Madame Figaro Cyprus

1980 establishments in France
French-language magazines
Liberal media in France
Magazines established in 1980
Magazines published in Paris
Newspaper supplements
Weekly magazines published in France
Women's fashion magazines
Women's magazines published in France